The following radio stations broadcast on AM frequency 820 kHz:

In Argentina 
 LRA8 in Formosa
 LRI208 Estación 820 in Lomas de Zamora, Buenos Aires
 LU24 in Tres Arroyos, Buenos Aires

In Canada 
 CHAM in Hamilton, Ontario - 50 kW daytime, 10 kW nighttime, transmitter located at

In Guatemala (Channel 29)
TGTO in Guatemala City

In Mexico 
 XEABCA-AM in Mexicali, Baja California
 XEBM-AM in San Luis Potosí, San Luis Potosí
 XEGRC-AM in Coyuca de Catalan, Guerrero

In the United States 
Stations in bold are clear-channel stations.

In Brazil 
 Rádio Aparecida in Aparecida, São Paulo

References

Lists of radio stations by frequency